The 2015 Goody's Headache Relief Shot 500 was a NASCAR Sprint Cup Series race held on November 1, 2015, at Martinsville Speedway in Ridgeway, Virginia. Contested over 500 laps on the .526 mile (.847 km)  short track, it was the 33rd race of the 2015 NASCAR Sprint Cup Series season, seventh race of the Chase and first race of the Eliminator Round. Jeff Gordon won the race, marking his first win of the season and also the last of his NASCAR career. Jamie McMurray finished second. Denny Hamlin, Dale Earnhardt Jr. and Kyle Busch rounded out the top-five.

Joey Logano won the pole for the race and led a race high of 207 laps before being taken out by Matt Kenseth late in the race and finished 37th. The race had 21 lead changes among nine different drivers, 18 caution flag periods for 109 laps and one red flag period for 12 minutes and 46 seconds.

This was the 93rd and final career win for Gordon, first of the season, ninth at Martinsville Speedway, 23rd at the track for Hendrick Motorsports and clinched Gordon a spot in the championship Ford EcoBoost 400 race at Homestead-Miami Speedway. He left Martinsville with an eight–point lead in the points standings. Chevrolet left with a 57–point lead over Toyota in the manufacturer standings.

The Goody's Headache Relief Shot 500 was carried by NBC Sports on the cable/satellite NBCSN network for the American television audience. The radio broadcast for the race was carried by the Motor Racing Network and Sirius XM NASCAR Radio.

Report

Background

Martinsville Speedway is an International Speedway Corporation-owned NASCAR stock car racing track located in Henry County, in Ridgeway, Virginia, just to the south of Martinsville. At  in length, it is the shortest track in the NASCAR Sprint Cup Series. The track was also one of the first paved oval tracks in NASCAR, being built in 1947 by H. Clay Earles. It is also the only race track that has been on the NASCAR circuit from its beginning in 1948. Along with this, Martinsville is the only NASCAR oval track on the entire NASCAR track circuit to have asphalt surfaces on the straightaways, then concrete to cover the turns.

Eight drivers entered tied for the points lead.

Entry list
The entry list for the Goody's Headache Relief Shot 500 was released on Monday, October 26 at 2:56 p.m. Eastern time. Forty-three cars were entered for the race. All were entered for the previous week's race at Talladega. Kyle Fowler  made his second career start in the No. 32 Go FAS Racing Ford. Alex Kennedy returned to the seat of the No. 33 Hillman-Circle Sport LLC Chevrolet. Brett Moffitt returned to the seat of the No. 34 Front Row Motorsports Ford. Ryan Preece made his second Sprint Cup Series start in the No. 98 Premium Motorsports Ford.

First practice

Qualifying

He said afterwards that he's amazed at the "run we’re on right now,” Logano said after claiming the pole with a lap of 98.548 mph. “I’m just the lucky guy that gets to drive this thing right now. It’s so much fun and we’re doing everything right. But all that can in a blink of an eye, so we all just have to keep our focus. I don't believe in luck. I believe in hard work, and that's what this team is doing right now." Martin Truex Jr., after qualifying second, said that his team "didn’t know going into qualifying we’d have that good of speed. Definitely a good start to the weekend for us.” After qualifying 14th, Carl Edwards said that he "just wasn’t fast enough the very first run so I put a run on the tires and got us a cycle behind everyone. It’s okay, we’re going to be just fine. I think in my history of qualifying here, this is still about 10–spots better than normal. We have a fast pit crew, the car is a lot better than it was in practice and I think for all these [Xfinity] guys, I think they’re all excited about the race. It’s one of our strong points at JGR and I’m going to have some fun on Sunday.” Kasey Kahne wrecked his car in the first round of qualifying and had to go to a backup car. Because he made a qualifying run, he started from the rear of the field. Speaking on the incident, he said that he "ruined a pretty good car, a really good car, actually. I held it out a little too late, I turned in and kind of broke and lifted off the throttle and got wheel-hopping. I just totally screwed it up myself.”

Qualifying results

Practice (post-qualifying)

Second practice
Tony Stewart started from the rear of the field after wrecking his primary car in the session and going to a backup car.

Final practice

Race

First half

Start
Being on the first Sunday of Standard Time, with a 5:23 pm sunset and no lights at the track, after rain earlier in the day, pit lane was still being dried when the race began under the safety car, counting laps under caution condition at 1:24 p.m. NASCAR decided that they were satisfied with the track's condition and under cloudy Virginia skies, Joey Logano led the field to the green flag on lap 8. Martin Truex Jr. got around Logano exiting turn 4 and took the lead on lap 10. A. J. Allmendinger began pressuring Truex for the lead on lap 20. With the small size of Martinsville, it only took to lap 26 for the leader to catch the end of the field. The lapped traffic allowed Truex to pull away from Allmendinger. He got passed by Logano and Jeff Gordon and fell back to fifth. Logano got under Truex going into turn 1 to retake the lead on lap 37. Gordon drove under Logano in turn 1 to take the lead on lap 45. The second caution of the race flew on lap 51. This was a scheduled competition caution due to overnight rain. Thanks to the first pit stall, Logano exited pit road with the lead. Denny Hamlin was tagged for speeding on pit road and restarted the race from the tail-end of the field.

The race restarted on lap 57. Kurt Busch got under Joey Logano going into turn 1 to take the lead on lap 61. He was unable to pull away from Logano after 20 laps and he eventually lost the lead to him on lap 83. The third caution of the race flew on lap 102 for a single-car spin in turn 1. It appeared that Michael Annett got turned by Matt DiBenedetto. Austin Dillon was tagged for having too many crew members over the wall and restarted the race from the tail-end of the field.

The race restarted on lap 113. It only took a lap for the fourth caution of the race to fly for a multi-car wreck in turn 3. In a classic Martinsville accordion-effect, a number of cars got into each other and spun out. Amongst them were Aric Almirola, Denny Hamlin and Kyle Larson.

The race restarted on lap 120. The fifth caution of the race flew on lap 127 for a single-car wreck in turn 3. Ricky Stenhouse Jr. suffered a right-front tire blowout and slammed the wall. Paul Menard was tagged for an uncontrolled tire and restarted the race from the tail-end of the field. Greg Biffle was tagged for running over his air hose and restarted the race from the tail-end of the field.

Second quarter
The race restarted on lap 135. The sixth caution of the race flew on lap 136 for a single-car wreck in turn 3. Ryan Preece cut the curb going into the turn, clipped Sam Hornish Jr. and sent him spinning.

The race restarted on lap 142. Danica Patrick got shoved into the turn 3 wall on lap 156 by David Gilliland. She was saved by the seventh caution of the race that flew on lap 157 for a single-car spin on the backstretch. It appeared that Greg Biffle got turned by another car exiting turn 2. Hornish made contact with Biffle as he was unable to avoid him. Austin Dillon opted not to pit and assumed the lead.

The race restarted on lap 162. Dillon was no match for Joey Logano on old tires as the No. 22 passed him in turn 1 to retake the lead on lap 166. The eighth caution of the race flew on lap 172 for a two-car wreck in turn 2. Kyle Busch got loose exiting turn 2 after running his left-front tire over a patch of water hugging the curb, got into Dillon and spun out. Carl Edwards got into the back of A. J. Allmendinger and damaged the front of his car.

The race restarted on lap 180. Race control issued Logano a warning to maintain his speed coming to the restart zone. The ninth caution of the race flew on lap 186 for a single-car wreck in turn 3. David Ragan was trying to pass Kyle Larson going into turn 3 when they made contact, hit Clint Bowyer and sent him backwards into the wall. Bowyer would go on to finish 43rd.

The race restarted on lap 192. Kevin Harvick passed Logano on the outside in turn 3 to take the lead on lap 200. After a series of caution flag periods, the race settled into a green flag run. Harvick ran into lapped traffic after 25 laps in the lead and Logano began reeling him in. He was unable to pass Harvick and lost second–place to teammate Brad Keselowski. Keselowski passed Harvick for the lead just as the 10th caution of the race flew on lap 236 for a single-car spin on the backstretch. Once again, Greg Biffle got loose exiting turn 2 and spun out. Logano exited pit road with the lead.

Second half

Halfway
The race restarted on lap 243. Brad Keselowski caught the tail end of his teammate after 10 laps. He eventually got by to take the lead on lap 256. The 11th caution of the race flew on lap 280 for a single-car spin on the backstretch. Exiting turn 2, Greg Biffle got loose and spun out once again. Joey Logano exited pit road with the lead.

The race restarted on lap 287. Keselowski passed his teammate going into turn 3 to retake the lead on lap 294. The 12th caution of the race flew with 122 laps to go for a single-car wreck in turn 3. Kyle Fowler suffered a right-front tire blowout and slammed the wall.

Fourth quarter

The race restarted with 113 laps to go. Joey Logano drove by his teammate to retake the lead with 111 laps to go. Keselowski drove by his teammate going into turn 1 to retake the lead with 105 laps to go. Logano took back the lead with 89 laps to go. In under a lap, Keselowski fell back to third. The 13th caution of the race flew with 83 laps to go for a single-car spin in turn 4. Danica Patrick was trying to wreck David Gilliland when she spun herself out in turn 4. She said after the race that Gilliland "unnecessarily, I thought, took me out at the beginning of the race. So I was just repaying the favor.’’ Denny Hamlin was tagged for speeding on pit road and restarted the race from the tail-end of the field.

The race restarted with 75 laps to go. The 14th caution of the race flew for a single-car spin in turn 3. Sam Hornish Jr. tried to go underneath Jeb Burton, clipped him and sent him spinning.

The race restarted with 66 laps to go. The 15th caution of the race flew for a multi-car wreck on the backstretch. Exiting turn 2, Keselowski spun out Matt Kenseth, sent him into a t-bone collision with Kurt Busch and the No. 41 car slammed the inside wall. Keselowski said that he "got hit from behind and it pushed me into the 20 (Kenseth). The right-front wheel hit Kenseth's left-rear and it just broke the right-front suspension off the car. Car wouldn't turn and just kept going straight until I couldn't do nothing and just started wrecking everybody. Didn't have any steering wheel left." Busch said that he "just got caught up and we were a victim. We were somebody else's collateral damage. It's a product of how everybody has to race in this Chase. For us there is so much more to our story. It's been a fantastic season. … We led laps today. We were up front. Restarting third with a set of fresh tires and 70 laps to go, I mean we were in perfect position. We did our job, we just didn't have luck on our side."

The race restarted with 57 laps to go. The 16th caution of the race flew with 47 laps to go for a two-car wreck in turn 1. Matt Kenseth, not happy with the incident a few weeks earlier and on the preceding caution, took out race leader Joey Logano, gaining a standing ovation from spectators. After being released from the infield care center, Logano said that Kenseth made "a complete coward move." When asked about Logano's remark Kenseth said that he didn't "have any comment for that. Some days you're the bat, some days you're the ball. It's never fun when you're the ball." This brought out the red flag to clean up the mess. With Logano being taken out, the lead went to Jeff Gordon. The red flag was lifted and the field continued with 45 laps remaining and little remaining daylight. Kyle Larson was tagged for speeding on pit road and restarted the race from the tail-end of the field. Hamlin opted not to pit and assumed the lead.

The race restarted with 41 laps to go. A. J. Allmendinger took the lead from Hamlin with 39 laps to go. The 17th caution of the race flew with 34 laps to go, when Austin Dillon clipped David Ragan and sent him spinning in turn 2.

The race restarted with 30 laps to go. Jeff Gordon passed Allmendinger for the lead in turn 1 with 21 laps to go. The 18th caution of the race flew with seven laps to go for a spin by Sam Hornish Jr. After the race restarted with two laps to go, Gordon held off Jamie McMurray to score his 93rd career victory, just seconds from official sunset.  While the drivers were not informed of such at the time, as the track did not have lights, the Lap 499 restart was not an official green-white-checker finish.  Had there been another incident before Gordon crossed the start-finish line to start Lap 500, the checkered flag would have waved because of darkness without an attempt to finish the race under green flag conditions, as a lack of daylight would have ended the race at regulation.

Post-race

Driver comments
Gordon joked in victory lane that he wasn’t going to retire after this season, saying “[t]his is the sweetest, most amazing feeling. I am so proud of this team. You want to talk about holding back emotions; right now man, wow, we’re going to Homestead! I can’t believe it. What an incredible battle that was.” He also added that he thought "the thing that's probably been more of an impact on me is just when we haven't performed the way that we want to, the way that I feel like we should, you just feel like you're disappointing people. That's tough. That weighs on you," he said. "You sit there, I don't even know how to describe it, but you just constantly have that over you. Not pressure as much as I don't know how to describe it. ... It's like your father when you're a kid. You want to please him, do everything you can to make everybody happy. We weren't doing a great job of it. Hopefully, everybody's a little bit happier now and we can give everybody something to cheer about at Homestead."  Gordon eventually made eight starts in 2016, with the October 2016 Martinsville Speedway being his last in NASCAR's premiership, and a sports car racing start in 2017, winning the 24 Hours of Daytona.

Following a runner-up finish, McMurray said of the final restart that he was somewhat glad that "Jeff gave me the outside...I struggled on the inside. Knowing it was just going to be a green-white-checkered, I thought I might be able to get around him." He then added that he "drove as hard as I could. Jeff was on the outside. His car stuck a little bit better than mine. I was hoping I could just get close enough to him down the backstretch that I could make some more drama for today versus what we already had. I spun the tires really bad off turn two and wasn’t able to get to his back.”

After a third–place finish, Hamlin said that his day "was eventful to say the least – two pit road penalties, my car wasn’t very good at all up until the very, very end and we just took a long time to get going. It’s just part of it. This racing now is different now than what it used to be when I first came in the sport and it's just survival of the fittest.”

Media comments

Members of the NASCAR media gave their take on what happened with Matt Kenseth and Joey Logano. Pete Pistone of the Motor Racing Network said that for some reason, "it’s now become a tolerable practice to not worry about winning anything fair and square, but rather plot the best way to screw your competitor from succeeding" and that "[s]portsmanship has joined the Dodo bird on the extinction list."

Jeff Gluck of USA Today said that "Kenseth should be suspended for next week’s race at Texas Motor Speedway — even though that won’t help salvage Logano’s title hopes" and that the sport "needs to decide what it wants to be. Is it a form of competition that provides an even playing field in order to determine wins and championships? Or is it a glorified county fair demolition derby which emphasizes entertainment over integrity?"

Larry McReynolds of Fox Sports said that "if NASCAR doesn't drop the hammer on Matt Kenseth[,] well shame on them" and that "if I hear the word probation, I'm going to find the nearest trash can and throw up. Probation means nothing in our sport. It's a hollow word used in our sport."

Drew Davison of the Fort Worth Star-Telegram said that the sport "finds itself in a predicament" in which "it is also flirting with being more in line with professional wrestling than an actual sport."

Tom Jensen of said that while "drama and the tension of the Chase are wonderful to watch most of the time...there has to be a limit, especially when using a 3,250-pound race car as a weapon. This has to stop and it has to stop now."

Jenna Fryer of the Associated Press said that the incident is "NASCAR's version of the 'wild West'" and while "[p]ayback has always been accepted...[i]t's time for France (NASCAR's chairman and CEO) to decide if that is 'quintessential NASCAR' or not."

Gerry Fraley of The Dallas Morning News said that "NASCAR let this situation grow" with Brian France calling Logano's actions at Kansas "quintessential NASCAR" and that the situation that "happening is straight out of World Wrestling Entertainment. Get away with anything you can while the referee looks the other way."

Thomas Pope of The Fayetteville Observer said that while he doesn't condone the actions of Kenseth, "NASCAR is as much at fault for what happened as Kenseth or Logano. They let the foundation for this kind of thing be built by not blackflagging an overly aggressive Logano, who could’ve gotten somebody killed, at Kansas. Kenseth was fed up with being pushed around, and Sunday, he pushed back."

Dave Moody of Sirius XM NASCAR Radio said of Denny Hamlin's take on the incident that while Hamlin "is entitled to his opinion...[am I] the only one who’s tired of hearing drivers say, 'NASCAR should protect us from ourselves?' Brian France and Mike Helton don’t drive race cars. Drivers do. These are grown men (and women) who can handle their own affairs, both on and off the race track. They do not need an 'authority figure' to teach them right from wrong."

Ryan McGee of ESPN.com took a different approach by saying NASCAR fans "can't watch Matt Kenseth pile-drive Joey Logano so hard that they damn near knock down the Turn 1 wall and then cry outrage and spew righteous anger and question the sanity and humanity and unsportsmanlike conduct of it all. Not at the end of the same week when we all wondered giddily aloud if that exact scenario might take place."

NASCAR CEO speaks on incident

Speaking to Mike Bagley and Pete Pistone on the Sirius XM NASCAR Radio program The Morning Drive, NASCAR Chairman and CEO Brian France said that Matt Kenseth went too far in taking out Joey Logano.

He added that the sanctioning body doesn't "want that to happen again. We don’t want any of our events to be altered in a way they shouldn’t be. What we want to prevent happening is drivers or any participant in NASCAR to take matters into their own hands and begin to control the outcome of races beyond hard racing. When that happens, that’s a very serious thing for us. And we’ll be dealing with that.”

He continued by saying what happened at Kansas "was an entirely different situation. What we’re not going to do is take the style of NASCAR and parlay that into something where one driver believes the way to pay back somebody for something that happened is take matters into their own hands. Obviously, we won’t be accepting that."

He then said that hard racing is "[t]he way to pay drivers back...That’s NASCAR. But what happened on Sunday is not quite the way we’d like things to turn out.”

He concluded by saying while he sympathized with Kenseth being disappointed after Kansas, there are limits to "Boys, have at it" and every driver knows "those limits. They know. They understand what’s hard racing, taking chances, a little bit of contact – and they realize when they do something that’s way over the line. They may not say it, but they understand it – and we certainly do.”

Post-race penalties
On the Tuesday after the race, NASCAR suspended Matt Kenseth for two races for his role in the incident that took out Joey Logano. According to NASCAR Executive Vice-President and Chief Racing Development Officer Steve O'Donnell, Kenseth "eliminated the No. 22 car’s opportunity to continue to compete in the race. Additionally, we factored aspects of safety into our decision, and also the fact that the new Chase elimination format puts a premium on each and every race. These actions have no place in NASCAR.” Shortly after the announcement, Joe Gibbs Racing announced that they would appeal the decision and "challenge the severity of the penalty which is believed to be inconsistent with previous penalties for similar on-track incidents. There will be no further comments from JGR personnel during the appeal process."

Additionally, Danica Patrick was fined $50,000 dollars, docked 25–points and put on NASCAR probation through December 31. NASCAR had no comment on the penalty handed to the driver of the No. 10 car.  However, it was assumed that Patrick's fine was for her radio conversations and repeated incidents with David Gilliland during the race after Gilliland spun Patrick the first time, she went "headhunting" for Gilliland, and initiated contact with him twice to cause separate safety car periods.

Appeal
On the Thursday after the race, the National Motorsports Appeals Panel upheld Matt Kenseth's two race suspension. After hearing the testimony from Joe Gibbs Racing and NASCAR, the panel decided that Kenseth "violated the rules set forth in the penalty notice" and upheld the original penalty levied by NASCAR. JGR decided to make the final appeal to the National Motorsports Final Appeals Officer Brian Moss.

Final appeal
Later that day, National Motorsports Final Appeals Officer Bryan Moss upheld the two race suspension, but amended the probation penalty to conclude on December 31 instead of in six months. Not surprisingly, Kenseth was "more than a little disappointed on the decision and the penalties to start with...I’m the first driver in the 65-year history of NASCAR to get suspended for an incident that happened in a Sprint Cup Series race. I feel like I was unfairly made the example. I’m extremely disappointed, but we’ll get through this, and I look forward to going to Homestead. I’m not going to change who I am. I’m not going to change what I stand for. I’m not going to change how I race. I’ve been in this business a long time, and I feel like I’ve had a pretty good career to this point and I feel like I’m going to continue to have the respect on the racetrack that I feel like I deserve.” Team owner Joe Gibbs said that their motive "for appealing is we felt like the penalty was kind of unprecedented and it was inconsistent with a number of other on-track incidents." Erik Jones drove in place of Kenseth at Texas and Phoenix.

Race results

Race statistics
21 lead changes among 9 different drivers
18 cautions for 109 laps; 1 red flag for 12:46
Time of race: 3 hours, 46 minutes, 35 seconds
Average speed: 
Jeff Gordon took home $199,836 in winnings

Race awards
 Coors Light Pole Award: Joey Logano (19.215, 
 3M Lap Leader: Joey Logano (207 laps)
 American Ethanol Green Flag Restart Award: Jeff Gordon
 Duralast Brakes "Bake In The Race" Award: Joey Logano
 Freescale "Wide Open": Jamie McMurray
 Ingersoll Rand Power Move: A. J. Allmendinger (6 positions)
 MAHLE Clevite Engine Builder of the Race: Hendrick Engines, #24
 Mobil 1 Driver of the Race: Jeff Gordon (128.6 driver rating)
 Moog Steering and Suspension Problem Solver of The Race: Denny Hamlin (crew chief Dave Rogers  (0.151 seconds))
 NASCAR Sprint Cup Leader Bonus: Jeff Gordon, ($10,000)
 Sherwin-Williams Fastest Lap: A. J. Allmendinger (Lap 14, 19.860)
 Sunoco Rookie of The Race: Jeb Burton

Media

Television
NBCSN covered the race on the television side. Rick Allen, 1997 race winner Jeff Burton and Steve Letarte had the call in the booth for the race. Dave Burns, Mike Massaro, Marty Snider and Kelli Stavast handled pit road on the television side.

Radio
MRN had the radio call for the race, which was simulcast on Sirius XM NASCAR Radio. Joe Moore and Jeff Striegle called the race from the booth when the field was racing down the frontstretch. Dave Moody called the race from the turn 3 stand when the field was racing down the backstretch. Alex Hayden, Winston Kelley and Steve Post handled pit road on the radio side.

{| class="wikitable" style="font-size: 95%;"
|-
!colspan="3"|MRN 
|-
!Booth announcers!!Turn announcers!!Pit reporters
|-
| Lead announcer: Joe MooreAnnouncer: Jeff Striegle|| Backstretch: Dave Moody || Alex HaydenWinston KelleySteve Post
|}

Standings after the race

Drivers' Championship standings

'Race for Fifth'NOTE:  Drivers eliminated after each cut will have their score reset to the base score of 2,000 points and three points for every win in the regular season, and the points they score in each race will count towards final standings.  The four drivers eliminated after Phoenix will have their Chase points from the nine races added to the base score at the start of the Chase for the race to fifth.''

Manufacturers' Championship standings

Note: Only the first sixteen positions are included for the driver standings.

Notes

References

VMI Keydets bask Virginia
Goody's Headache Relief Shot 500
NASCAR races at Martinsville Speedway